Gardner Hunting (1872 - 1958) was an American screenwriter and author. He edited People's Magazine. From Michigan, he wrote Vicarion and other stories. In 1916, he contracted with Wharton Incorporated to be in charge of their film scenarios.

Their Friendly Enemy is set in Pentwater, Michigan and is about two high school graduates who buy the local newspaper and become its editors.

Bibliography
A Hand in the Game 1911 Henry Holt and Company, New York 1911, also by Quinn & Boden Company. Illustrated by J. N. Marchand 
Touchdown-and after, Macmillan, New York, 1920 
The Vicarion, 1926
Barry Dare and the mysterious box, A. L. Burt company, New York c. 1929
Working with God: Awakening the Genii Within Your Mind, Unity School of Christianity, Kansas City, 1947(pa

Selected filmography
Redeeming Love (film) (1916)
 The Scarlet Oath (1916)
Husband and Wife (1916)
Johnny Get Your Gun (1919) written by Lawrence Burke and Gardner Hunting
 If Women Only Knew (1921)

References

1872 births
1958 deaths
20th-century American male writers
American male screenwriters
American magazine editors
20th-century American screenwriters